Snakebite: Blacktop Ballads & Fugitive Songs is an album by Stan Ridgway. It was released in 2004 through redFLY Records.

Production
After the deaths of two former Wall of Voodoo bandmates, Ridgway wrote "Talkin' Wall of Voodoo Blues Pt. 1", a reflection on the band's history.

Critical reception
PopMatters called the album "full of the sort of lyrical darkness that's been a hallmark of Ridgway's material since the get-go." The Monterey County Weekly wrote: "To accompany his off-kilter lyrics, Ridgway plays music that evokes country blues artists, Tom Waits and arty electronic bands from the ‘80s. Throughout the album, strange instruments accentuate Ridgway’s surreal stories." The Stranger wrote that "the dusty, atmospheric songs of Snakebite bristle and twitch with stringed instruments." The Times of Northwest Indiana called it "perhaps [Ridgway's] finest overall collection to date," writing that "like the best of Ridgway's eclectic oeuvre, the 16 songs nestled into this 'Three Act' album are musical vignettes populated by a twisted cast of darkly-hue characters most everyone can relate to in some way."

Track listing

Personnel 
Bob Demaa – mastering
Baboo God – mixing
Stan Ridgway – Banjo, Bells, Celeste, Composer, Engineer, Guitar, Guitar (Nylon String), Hammer Dulcimer, Harmonica, Harp, Mandolin, Melodica, Slide Guitar, Sound Effects, Vocals, production, engineering, mixing
Doug Schwartz – mastering
Alvin Fike – Brass, French Horn, Saxophone, Woodwind
Skip Heller – Guitar, Guitar (Nylon String), Hi String Guitar, Piano
Brantley Kearns – Fiddle
Ricky King – Flute (Wood), Guitar, Vocals
David Sutton – Bass, Bass (Acoustic), Box
Pietra Wexstun – Autoharp, Celeste, Composer, Effects, Elka, Farfisa Organ, Glockenspiel, Juno, Loops, Mellotron, Oberheim Synthesizer, Organ, Programming, Reed Organ, Sampling, Sound Effects, Vocals, Wurlitzer
Bruce Zelesnik – Bird Calls, Drums, Handclapping, Hand Drums, Jawbone, Percussion, Prop Design, Rake, Rhythm, Siren, Sound Effects, Spoons, Train Whistle, Trash Cans

References 

2004 albums
Stan Ridgway albums